Albertus Wielsma (19 December 1883, in Amsterdam – 26 March 1968, in Amsterdam) was a Dutch rower.

After a four months training period, he competed in the 1908 Summer Olympics in the coxless four event. He and the other of the team were a member of "de Amstel" and trained by Ooms. The team won the bronze medal in the coxless four.

References

External links
 
 
 

1883 births
1968 deaths
Dutch male rowers
Olympic rowers of the Netherlands
Rowers at the 1908 Summer Olympics
Olympic bronze medalists for the Netherlands
Rowers from Amsterdam
Olympic medalists in rowing
Medalists at the 1908 Summer Olympics
20th-century Dutch people